This article is a partial translation of the Cash investigation article on the French Wikipedia. The image and some of the information it contains were drawn from there.

Cash Investigation is a French television news show. It produces investigative reports in the financial and business space. The investigations cover subjects such as greenwashing, neuromarketing and child labor. They also take on the diversion of public funds, tax evasion, lobbyist influence, conflicts of interest and information manipulation by spin doctors.

Put out by the Premières Lignes (Front Lines) production group, Luc Hermann and veteran journalist Paul Moreira, the broadcast operates in the tradition of such investigation news shows as 60 Minutes, Panorama, Frontline and Enquête (Inquiry).

Premières Lignes Prizes

2016 International Current Affairs and Social Documentary Film Festival 2016 - Scam prize for investigation 
2015 Press’Tival - Gilles Jacquier Grand Prize - for The unspeakable secrets of our telephones
Prix de l'investigation DIG Awards

2015 DIG Awards - Prize for European Investigation 
2015 Data Journalism Awards - top prize for LuxLeaks (ICIJ and Edouard Perrin of Cash Investigation)
2015 non-profit Anticor's Prize for Ethics 
2014 Press International - Grand Prize
2014 Ilaria Alpi Prize for international investigation
2014 Best Magazine Les Lauriers de l’Audiovisuel (Audiovisual Laurels)
2013 Le Parisien - Best Magazine Star
2013 Media Grand Prize—CB News 
2012 European Louise Weiss European prize, decryption category

 Broadcasts

Each episode of season 1 (in 2012) also contained, in its second half, a portrait of a whistleblower.

When the broadcast faced cancellation , viewers organized an online petition demanding its reinstatement. The show returned in June 2013.

Season 2 had five episodes. The report on tax evasion, broadcast in primetime following the Cahuzac scandal, was a critical and audience success.

In season 3 the show broadcast regularly in primetime on Tuesday evenings.

In July 2015, Premières Lignes put the program's broadcasts online on YouTube..

In season 3, the team for the first time produced an investigation specifically designed for the internet. Broadcast on Francetvinfo.fr, Ces entreprises qui vendent des systèmes de sécurité aux pires dictatures de la planète (These organizations that sell security systems to the worst dictatorships on the planet) completed the investigation outlined on the Business de la peur (The Business of Fear), broadcast of September 21, 2015.

France 2 ordered a fourth season from Premières Lignes, with the first numbers due to be broadcast in 2016.Cash Investigation episodes are available online for a month after broadcast at pluzz.fr 

 Season 1 (2012) 

 Season 2 (2013) 

 Season 3 (2014-2015) 

 Season 4 (2015-2016) 

 Season 5 (2016-2017) 

Credits

 Controversies 
 In June 2012 the World Wildlife Fund sued France 2 to prevent broadcast of an interview of the NGO's management. The courts ruled in favor of France 2.
 On October 2, 2013, the program revealed that the French government had fined the training arm of Jardiland 3.2 million euros in September 2012. The issue was fraudulent transactions concerning hundreds of false training certificates issued between 2007 and 2011. The certificates allowed them to illegally receive subsidies from professional training organizations. Jardiland announced it would bring a defamation suit against France Télévisions, publicly accusing the Cash investigation report of presenting false information. In April 2015 more than a year later, Jardiland withdrew its suit.
 In 2015, Rachida Dati criticized the broadcast for the questions it raised about a possible link between Rachida Dati and the Engie corporation (formerly GDF-Suez).
She opposed the measure because it would hamper the production of broadcasts like Cash investigation. A book was scheduled for publication in 2015 
 After the February 2, 2016 broadcast of Produits chimiques, nos enfants en danger (Chemical products, our children in danger), the Association française pour l'information scientifique (AFIS) (French Association for Scientific Information) issued a press release claiming that the documentary misled viewers. It cited the transformation of the summary of the European Food Safety Authority, which said: "Plus de 97 % des aliments contiennent des résidus de pesticides dans les limites légales dont 54.6% ne contiennent aucun résidu détectable" (More than 97% of foods contain pesticide residues within legal limits; 54.6 of these contain no detectable trace), into "Plus de 97 % des aliments contiennent des résidus de pesticides" (More than 97% of foods contain pesticide residues). Several weeks later AFIS returned to the subject, in a more detailed article, Comment les téléspectateurs ont été abusés par 'Cash Investigation'''. The disputed number is cited once at the beginning of the  episode.

References

External links
 Production website 

French television news shows
2012 French television series debuts